Lovro Kos (born 23 July 1999) is a Slovenian ski jumper.

Kos made his FIS Ski Jumping World Cup debut in January 2021 in Willingen. His best result in World Cup so far is third place, achieved in Garmisch-Partenkirchen on 1 January 2022 in the 2021–22 Four Hills Tournament. He competed at the 2022 Winter Olympics in Beijing and won a silver medal in the men's large hill team event.

References

External links

1999 births
Living people
Skiers from Ljubljana
Slovenian male ski jumpers
Olympic ski jumpers of Slovenia
Ski jumpers at the 2022 Winter Olympics
Medalists at the 2022 Winter Olympics
Olympic silver medalists for Slovenia
Olympic medalists in ski jumping
21st-century Slovenian people
FIS Nordic World Ski Championships medalists in ski jumping